Kottarakkara (IAST: Koṭṭārakkara), also transliterated as Kottarakara, is a town and municipality in the Kollam district of the Kerala, India. The town is close to Kollam Port, which has a rich history linked to the early medieval period as well as the reputation as an important commercial, industrial and trading center.

History

Kottarakkara, also known in the ancient days of the kings as the Elayadathu Swarupam, was a principality ruled by a branch of the Travancore Royal Family. It is the home of Kathakali, a well known dance drama which originated initially as Ramanattam created in the 17th century by Prince Kottarakkara Thampuran and later patronized by the Raja of Kottarakkara in the early 19th century absorbing other dance forms of Krishnattam with further innovations.

Etymology
Kottarakkara, a compound word made up of the words Kottaram, meaning "palace", and kara meaning "land", literally means "land of palaces".  The area which had several palaces was thus named "Kottarakkara."

Geography
Kottarakkara is a small principality close to Kollam.  As a taluk headquarters, it has six panchayats and other small towns. It is surrounded by several other towns.

Towns and villages in Kottarakara Taluk 

 Ampalakkara
 Andoor
 Chadayamangalam
 Chengamanadu 
 Chakkuvarakkal
 Cherupoika
 Chithara
 Elamad
 Ezhukone
 Irukunnam
 Ittiva
 Kadakkal
 Kalayapuram
 Kareepra- Edakkidom
 Karickom
 Kottarakkara
Kottathala
 Kottukkal
 Kulakkada
 Kummil
 Malavila
 Mankode
 Melila
 Mylom
 Neduvathur
 Nilamel
 Odanavattom
 Panaveli
 Pavithreswaram
 Pooyappally
 Puthoor
 Sadhanathapuram
 Thrikkannamangal
 Ummannur
 Valakom
 Velinallur
 Veliyam
 Vettikkavala

Climate

Politics

Kottarakara Assembly Constituency is one among the 11 assembly constituencies in Kollam district. K.N.Balagopal is the present MLA from Kottarakkara constituency. Kottarakkara comes under Mavelikkara (Lok Sabha constituency)(previously it was in Adoor Loksabha constituency) that represents a large area including Kottarakkara, Mavelikkara, Changanasseri, spread in Kollam, Alappuzha and Kottayam districts.

E Chandrasekaran Nair (CPI), D.Damodaran Potti (PSP), R.Balakrishna Pillai (Kerala Congress), E.Chandrasekaran Nair (CPI), C.Achutha Menon (CPI), Kottara Gopalakrishnan (INC) and R.Balakrishna Pillai (Kerala Congress - B) are the former elected members represented Kottarakara Assembly Constituency in the past.
Mandalam president: G.Peter (Kerala Congress)

Transportation

Road Network 
NH 744 earlier known as NH 208 (Kollam to Thirumangalam) meets the MC road (Thiruvananthapuram to Angamaly) at Kottarakkara.
Kottarakkara is linked with Kollam (the district headquarters), both by road and rail, at a distance of 27 km. It is 66 km to the north of Thiruvananthapuram (the capital of Kerala) and 80 km to the south of Kottayam.

Road

Kottarakara has one of the Kerala's well connected KSRTC Hub, consist of various services across almost all the parts of kerala and interstate services.
Local routes are connected by private bus services as well as State Transport. It is well connected to the capital city of Kerala, Thiruvananthapuram by KSRTC Fast Passenger, super fast, 
super deluxe, a/c low floor buses. Buses are also ply to the district headquarters of Kollam and Pathanamthitta and to towns in Tamil Nadu like Coimbatore, Tenkasi and Sengottai and Daily trips to Mookambika, Sullia Munnar, Chennai, Hosur Bangalore, Velankanni, Madurai, Kumily, Mysore, Kanyakumari, Coimbatore, Nagercoil, Thirunelveli, Tuticorin, Palani, Trichy, Ernakulam, Kannur, Palakkad, Thrissur, Mangalore, Sultan Bathery, Kasaragod. Kottarakara depot of ksrtc is one of the top revenue earning depots of the state.

Rail

Kottarakara railway station is located on the Kollam-Sengottai railway line. Kottarakara railway station, which currently connects to Kollam, Trivandrum, Ernakulam, Thrissur, Palakkad, Madurai, Chennai, Kanyakumari, Tirunelveli, Guruvayur, Varkala and Punalur through the direct passenger, fast passenger and express train services. There are eight pairs of services right now and heard that many more services would be inducted in this route since the Punalur-Schengotta ghat section has been closed for Broad Gauge conversion. Further, a new line from Chengannur to Thiruvananthapuram via Adoor and Pandalam is awaiting survey. Kottarakkara will become a junction once the new line materializes.

Air
The nearest airport is Trivandrum International Airport, .

Notable people

 Veliyam Bharghavan, Former General Secretary, Communist Party of India
 Bobby Kottarakkara, Malayalam actor
 K. B. Ganesh Kumar, actor and politician
 Kottarakkara Sreedharan Nair (1922–1986), actor
 R. Balakrishna Pillai, former Minister, MLA, MP and Panchayat President, Chairman of the Kerala Congress
 Sai Kumar, Malayalam actor
 Salim Yusuf - Physician, cardiologist and epidemiologist

Schools and Colleges

References

Further reading
 Parankamveettil; An ancient Christian Family based from Aippalloor spreads areas at Kizhakketheruvu, Chengamanadu, Kottarakara, Elampal, Ayoor etc. was Engaged in Agricultural Production, Tradings, Religious, Social and Cultural activities. 
 K. Ayyappapanicker; Sahitya Akademi (1997). Medieval Indian literature: an anthology. Sahitya Akademi. pp. 317–. .
 M. O. Koshy (1989). The Dutch power in Kerala, 1729–1758. Mittal Publications. pp. 64–. . 
 K. Srikumaran (1 January 2005). Theerthayathra: a pilgrimage through various temples. Bharatiya Vidya Bhavan. p. 129. .

External links

Kottarakara Municipality
Official Website Of Kottarakara Mahaganapthi

Cities and towns in Kollam district